The Nevada Renewable Energy and Energy Efficiency Authority was a state government agency in Nevada charged with promoting energy conservation and use of renewable energy sources. Its administrator held the title of Nevada Energy Commissioner.

The Authority was created by the state legislature in 2009. The Authority was eliminated in 2011, and its responsibilities were transferred to the State Office of Energy.

Commissioners

In 2009 Governor Jim Gibbons appointed the first Energy Commissioner, Hatice Gecol.

References

Renewable Energy and Energy Efficiency Authority
Renewable Energy and Energy Efficiency Authority
Energy policy of the United States
Government agencies established in 2009
2009 establishments in Nevada
Government agencies disestablished in 2011
2011 disestablishments in the United States
Energy regulatory authorities
Regulatory authorities of the United States